Jasmine Dotiwala is a British broadcaster, producer, and columnist. Dotiwala has worked with television and radio news platforms such as MTV, Channel 4 and BBC Radio London.

Early life 
Jasmine Dotiwala grew up in Southall, West London, where she attended Featherstone High School. She participated in the performing arts through her childhood; she began dance training when she was seven years old and started to teach dance by fifteen. After earning eight O-Levels, she read dance and drama at Surrey University and graduated in 1992.

Broadcasting career 
Dotiwala was first employed by production company Planet 24, which worked on the morning show The Big Breakfast, until she successfully auditioned for co-host of the Channel 4 programme The Word in 1994. After she co-hosted The Word for several years, she moved to MTV Europe where she was a presenter for MTV News, before becoming senior producer of shows including Making the Video and MTV Cribs. In 2006, she became head of MTV Base, where she interviewed artists such as Jay-Z and Eminem. The Guardian included her into its list of the 30 most important ethnic minorities in media in the following year. In 2009, she returned to Channel 4, where she worked on music programmes such as twentieth anniversary special for The Word. She moved to the BBC in 2011 to work in their Children's Development team, before moving to the BBC TV Music department where she worked on developing youth music content.

From 2011 to 2021, Dotiwala worked at the Media Trust charity, where she produced the news shows London 360, UK 360, and Arts 360. In 2014, she began reporting on mini arts and culture features for Channel 4 News. From 2014 to 2019, she returned to MTV to produce the MTV EMA Awards. In January 2018, she took over as Head of Youth Engagement & Media at Media Trust. She was a judge for the 2018 iteration of BBC's Woman's Hour Power List, which recognises women working in the music industry. In April 2018, Dotiwala was requested to give evidence at the House of Commons to MP's for the Youth Violence Commission. Later that year, she was announced as a presenter for the weekly BBC Radio London radio show The Scene.

Dotiwala was called to give evidence to peers of the House of Lords in May 2019 around the subject of the future of public service broadcasters in the era of streaming services. She was later named to the judging panel for the 2019 Namibian Annual Music Awards. In 2020, she joined Netflix UK.

Journalism
Dotiwala has written or blogged on publications including Huffington Post UK and The Voice.

References

External links
 

21st-century British journalists
Alumni of the University of Roehampton
British radio DJs
British radio presenters
British television presenters
British television personalities
British music journalists
British women columnists
British women journalists
British women television presenters
BBC radio producers
Channel 4 people
Living people
MTV people
Netflix people
People from Southall
British women radio presenters
Year of birth missing (living people)
Women radio producers
Alumni of the University of Surrey